Paula Boggs (born 1959) is the founder of Boggs Media, LLC, a business that manages her music, speaking, and other creative business activities.  She is a musician, public speaker, writer and lawyer. She is also a board member of numerous for-profit and non-profit organizations.  She served as executive vice president, general counsel and secretary of law and corporate affairs at Starbucks Corporation from 2002 to 2012.

Early life
Boggs is the oldest of four, and was born to parents Janice Barber and Nathaniel Boggs Jr. in Washington, D.C. She was raised Catholic. In 1972 her parents divorced and her mother took the kids to Europe, where she accepted teaching and administrator positions in Germany and Italy with the Department of Defense Schools System.  Her father was awarded Howard University's first PhD in zoology in 1963.

Career
Boggs served as vice president, legal, for products, operations and technology at Dell Computer Corporation, and as a partner at the law firm of Preston Gates & Ellis, LLP. She served as an Assistant U.S. Attorney, and in various capacities as an attorney for the U.S. Army, the Department of Defense and the White House Office of Legal Counsel. She served as a regular officer in the United States Army, and earned Army Airborne wings and a Congressional appointment to the US Naval Academy, among America's first women to do so.  She served in the policy-making body of the American Bar Association's House of Delegates.  Boggs also served on the Iran-Contra task force during the Reagan administration.
1981-1988: Regular officer in the army
1987-1988: Staff attorney, White House Iran-Contra Legal Task Force
1988-1994: Assistant U.S. Attorney for the Western District of Washington
1994: Staff director, Advisory Board on the Investigative Capability of Department of Defense
1995-1997: Partner at the firm of Preston Gates & Ellis
1997-2002: Vice president at Dell Corporation
2002-2012: Executive vice president, general counsel, and secretary of Starbucks Corporation
2007–Present: Frontwoman, Paula Boggs Band

Memberships and affiliations
Boggs serves on the boards of Avid, a leading provider of digital media technologies for media organizations and independent professionals, and the Seattle Symphony Orchestra.

She is former board member of Fender Musical Instruments Corporation, a former governor of the American Bar Association, trustee emerita of The Johns Hopkins University, former board member and secretary of public radio station KEXP and former director of School of Rock LLC.  She was named NASDAQ's top general counsel in 2009.  Boggs served as a member of the White House Council for Community Solutions from 2010 to 2012. She is also a former Chair of Legal Aid for Washington, and a former board member of the Seattle Art Museum.  She was appointed by President Barack Obama in 2013 as a member of the President's Committee on the Arts and the Humanities. She resigned from the President's Committee in August, 2017, co-signing a letter of resignation that said in reference to President Trump, "Ignoring your hateful rhetoric would have made us complicit in your words and actions."  She also served on the board of governors for the national American Red Cross.

Music career
Paula Boggs has written and recorded four full-length albums fronting the Paula Boggs Band, recorded two EPs and owns over 30 U.S. copyrights. She is also a voting member and a Governor of The Recording Academy, Pacific Northwest Chapter Board  and member of the Americana Music Association. Paula Boggs Band is sponsored by Deering Banjos, Breedlove Guitars and Radial Engineering, Inc.

Writing career
Paula Boggs's essays have appeared in national publications such as HuffPost and National Law Journal.

Education
Boggs received a B.A. from Johns Hopkins University, in international studies, where she was on a 4-year Reserve Officers' Training Corps (ROTC) scholarship and graduated first in her ROTC class.  She then attended the University of California, Berkeley, School of Law.  She also completed the U.S. Army Infantry Airborne School and earlier received a Congressional Appointment to the U.S. Naval Academy.

Awards and recognition
"The Presidential Service Certificate for Honorable Service in the White House", 1988
"Defense Meritorious Service Medal for Exceptionally Meritorious Service for the Armed Forces of the United States", 1987
The Johns Hopkins University Distinguished Alumna Award, 2009
U.S. Army Infantry Parachute Badge, 1980
U.S. Department of Justice Special Achievement Award ("for sustained superior performance of duty" 1990, 1991)
Secretary of Defense Award for Excellence, 1994
American Bar Association Spirit of Excellence Award, 2006
Sargent Shriver Award for Equal Justice, 2006
National Bar Association Wiley A. Branton Award, 2008
NASDAQ's Top General Counsel, 2009
WNBA Seattle Storm Woman of Distinction, 2012
Appointment to the U.S. Naval Academy Class of 1981, 1977
Army ROTC Four-Year Scholarship (Graduated first in Johns Hopkins University ROTC Class of 1981)
Distinguished Military Graduate, 1981
U.S. Army Honorable Discharge, 1988
Seattle Mayor’s Arts Award, 2018
Honorary Doctor of Laws, Southwestern University (Georgetown, Texas), 2021
Puget Sound Business Journal Board Director of the Year, 2021
Savoy Magazine Most Influential Black Corporate Director, 2021

References

Johns Hopkins University alumni
UC Berkeley School of Law alumni
African-American Catholics
1959 births
Living people
Jazz musicians from Washington (state)